Guo Yujie is a Chinese biathlete who competed at the 2022 Winter Paralympics.

Career
Guo served as the flag bearer for China at the 2022 Winter Paralympics. She won a gold medal in the women's 6 kilometre standing event.

References 

Living people
Biathletes at the 2022 Winter Paralympics
Medalists at the 2022 Winter Paralympics
Paralympic gold medalists for China
Paralympic medalists in biathlon
Year of birth missing (living people)
Sportspeople from Zhangjiakou